The 2015 Kazakhstan Futsal Cup was the 20th staging of the Kazakhstan Futsal Cup.

Venues
Matches of a group stage took place in "Zhaksy Sportcomplex". Other matches took place on "Baganashyl-Zenit Sportcomplex".

Group stage

Semi-final

Bronze medal match

Final

Top scorers

See also
2015–16 Kazakhstani Futsal First Division
2015–16 Kazakhstani Futsal Championship

References

Kazakhstan Futsal Cup
2015 in Kazakhstani football
Kazakhstani